Qiu Baoqin (born 1944) also known as Chou Pao-Chin is a former international table tennis player from China.

Table tennis career
She won a silver medal in the 1973 World Table Tennis Championships with Lin Meiqun.

See also
 List of table tennis players
 List of World Table Tennis Championships medalists

References

Living people
1944 births
Chinese female table tennis players
Table tennis players from Shanxi
People from Jinzhong
World Table Tennis Championships medalists